"Old Before I Die" is a song by English singer-songwriter Robbie Williams, released as the first single from his debut album, Life thru a Lens (1997). The Oasis-influenced song became a number-two hit in the United Kingdom and a number-one hit in Spain following its release on 14 April 1997.

Critical reception
Pan-European magazine Music & Media commented, "Williams certainly can't be accused of playing it safe in the wake of his departure from U.K popsters Take That. Instead, post-Freedom, he's opted for a radical change of musical direction. Gone is the sweet, middle of the road style, in favour of a solid and confident rock sound, somewhat reminiscent of his new pals, Oasis." A reviewer from Music Week rated the song four out of five, describing it as "a confidently composed return from the former Take That man, boasting a strong vocal, tuneful Beatlesesque melody and a ILR-friendly hook. On this evidence, Owen, Barlow and co may be left in Williams shadow." The magazine's Martin Aston complimented it as "pure Britpop/Beatles swagger and crunch." Ian Hyland from Sunday Mirror noted that the singer "has come up with some magic tracks", adding that songs like this are "stadium thrillers".

Music video
A music video was made to accompany the song. It features Robbie Williams performing for the camera with ageing rock stars as his backing band, and some fade-ins by the cameraman. There are also shots of Williams flying through the air.

Track listings

 UK CD1
 "Old Before I Die"
 "Better Days"
 "Average B Side"

 UK CD2
 "Old Before I Die"
 "Making Plans for Nigel"
 "Kooks"

 UK cassette single
 "Old Before I Die"
 "Making Plans for Nigel"
 "Better Days"

 European CD single
 "Old Before I Die"
 "Average B Side"

 Australian CD single
 "Old Before I Die"
 "Kooks"
 "Average B Side"
 "Making Plans for Nigel"
 "Better Days"

 Japanese mini-album
 "Old Before I Die"
 "Kooks"
 "Average B Side"
 "Making Plans for Nigel"
 "Better Days"
 "Freedom"

Credits and personnel
Credits are taken from the Life thru a Lens album booklet.

Studios
 Recorded at Matrix Maison Rouge (London, England)
 Mixed at Battery Studios (London, England)

Personnel

 Robbie Williams – writing, vocals, backing vocals
 Desmond Child – writing
 Eric Bazilian – writing
 Steve McEwan – backing vocals, guitar
 Guy Chambers – guitar, keyboards, production, arrangement
 Fil Eisler – guitar, bass
 Steve Power – keyboards, production, mixing
 Geoff Dugmore – drums, percussion
 Jim Brumby – Battery Studios assistant
 Matt Hay – Matrix Maison Rouge assistant

Charts and certifications

Weekly charts

Year-end charts

Certifications

References

1997 songs
1997 singles
Chrysalis Records singles
English rock songs
Number-one singles in Scotland
Number-one singles in Spain
Robbie Williams songs
Song recordings produced by Guy Chambers
Song recordings produced by Steve Power
Songs written by Desmond Child
Songs written by Eric Bazilian
Songs written by Robbie Williams

he:Life thru a Lens#Old Before I Die